Heshan Subdistrict is a subdistrict and the seat of Heshan District in Yiyang Prefecture-level City, Hunan, China. The subdistrict was reformed through the amalgamation of Longguangqiao Township and the former Heshan Subdistrict on November 26, 2015.

References

Heshan District, Yiyang
Subdistricts of Hunan
County seats in Hunan